Líně is a municipality and village in Plzeň-North District in the Plzeň Region of the Czech Republic. It has about 2,800 inhabitants.

Geography
It lies in the Plasy Uplands.

History
The first written mention of Líně is from 1115. For centuries it was a farming village, in the 19th century it was connected with coal mining.

Economy
The largest employer is a branch of the Gühring company. It is a manufacturer of rotating tools for metal processing.

Transport
The D5 motorway passes through the municipal territory.

A part of the Plzeň/Líně airport is located in the municipal territory (ICAO: LKLN), however, the airport is named after the municipality. It is a public domestic and private international airport. The airport was used as a base for the Soviet 6th Guards Fighter Aviation Division during Warsaw Pact invasion of Czechoslovakia between 21 August and 10 November 1968.

References

External links

Villages in Plzeň-North District